The 2001–02 Hartford Hawks women's basketball team represented the University of Hartford during the 2001–02 NCAA Division I women's basketball season. The team was coached by Jennifer Rizzotti. This was the first season the women's basketball team qualified for the NCAA tournament.

Schedule

|-
!colspan=9 style=| Non-conference regular season

|-
!colspan=9 style=| America East Women's Tournament

|-
!colspan=9 style=| NCAA Women's Tournament

References

Hartford Hawks women's basketball seasons
Hartford